Great Eppleton Wind Farm is a wind farm near Hetton-le-Hole, England. It is owned and operated by E.ON UK. Constructed in 1997, it was notable for originally consisting of twin-bladed turbines, as most wind turbines have three blades. On 29 September, E.ON announced it would replace these with four new REpower MM92 turbines giving a nameplate capacity of 8.2 MW.

References

External links

 E.ON UK - Great Eppleton Wind Farm

Wind farms in England
Power stations in North East England
E.ON